The C.D. Kelly House is a historic house at Main and Adams Streets in Judsonia, Arkansas.  It is a -story brick structure with Craftsman styling.  It has a gabled roof, with a central projecting half-story that is also gabled.  Gabled projections extend in several directions from the main block, with all of the gables and eaves exhibiting exposed rafters and large supporting brackets.  Built about 1925, it is the city's finest example of the Craftsman style in brick.

The house was listed on the National Register of Historic Places in 1991.

See also
National Register of Historic Places listings in White County, Arkansas

References

Houses on the National Register of Historic Places in Arkansas
Houses completed in 1925
Houses in White County, Arkansas
National Register of Historic Places in White County, Arkansas
Judsonia, Arkansas